Lockjaw is a character in American comic books published by Marvel Comics. Created by Stan Lee and Jack Kirby, the character first appeared in Fantastic Four #45 (December 1965). He is an Inhuman giant bulldog whose abilities include teleportation. He serves the Inhuman Royal Family as their escort and a loyal protector. 

Lockjaw has been described as one of Marvel's most notable and powerful animal heroes.

Lockjaw made his live-action debut in the 2017 Marvel Cinematic Universe (MCU) television series Inhumans.

Publication history

He first appeared in Fantastic Four #45 (December 1965), and was created by Stan Lee and Jack Kirby.

Fictional character biography
Lockjaw was born on the island of Attilan (formerly in the Atlantic Ocean and eventually moved to the Moon). Many times he has brought Inhumans to Earth and back again. At times, his powers have been manipulated by evil forces, most usually by Maximus the Mad. Lockjaw and the Royal Family encountered Maximus' creation, the Trikon, and were driven from Attilan's Great Refuge in exile.

Lockjaw first appeared as a member of the Inhumans when they attempted to retrieve Medusa from the outside world and take her back to Attilan. This led them into conflict with the Fantastic Four, the first humans they met, who were harboring Medusa after rescuing her from the villainous Frightful Four. Accordingly, Lockjaw is indirectly responsible for revealing the existence of Attilan to the outside world. They returned to Attilan and became trapped in Maximus' "negative zone" barrier around the Great Refuge.

Lockjaw is able to escape and becomes separated from his city. He roams the country for some time, accidentally terrorizing the local citizens, until he meets up with Johnny Storm and Wyatt Wingfoot. He journeyed with the pair in their attempt to breach the "negative zone" barrier. Before long, the Inhumans were freed from the "negative zone" barrier, and Lockjaw transported Crystal to New York, and brought Triton from Attilan to rescue Mister Fantastic. Lockjaw was later compelled to return Crystal to Attilan by Maximus.

With Crystal, Lockjaw was captured by Diablo. They later rescued the injured Quicksilver. Before long, Lockjaw attended the wedding of Quicksilver and Crystal. He also brought the Fantastic Four to Attilan to battle Thraxton.

Further adventures
At one point, Quicksilver and the Thing witnessed what appeared to be Lockjaw, apparently a sentient being once mutated by Terrigen Mists, speaking to them. This convinces Quicksilver not to expose his daughter Luna to the Mists. However, Lockjaw later brought Quicksilver to Washington, D.C., in search of X-Factor, and Quicksilver there stated that Lockjaw's sentience was actually a hoax perpetrated on the Thing by Karnak and Gorgon.

Lockjaw brought the other Inhumans to Earth in search of Medusa when she fled Attilan to avoid a compulsory abortion. He also transported the injured Triton back to Attilan. With Crystal, he later summoned the Avengers to help battle Thane Ector and the Brethren. With the Avengers, he battled the Brethren.

As noted in Ka-Zar #12, Lockjaw also travels to the Heroes Reborn universe with his Inhuman family. This visit lasts for about a year; all are returned successfully.

Having always been particularly fond of Ben Grimm, Lockjaw elects to stay with him. Ben, fondly recounting that he "always wanted a dog", accepted. It is not known why Lockjaw did not accompany Ben Grimm when he felt the need to retreat to France during the Civil War.

Lockjaw is featured into the 2006 limited series Son of M. With the majority of the mutants on Earth having been rendered powerless, Quicksilver decides to steal the Inhumans mutagenic Terrigen Mists and re-power willing mutants. Lockjaw is convinced to help him on the mission. Traveling with Quicksilver's daughter Luna, they traverse the Earth, heading to such places as Genosha. The other Inhumans follow.

Later, Lockjaw rejoins Black Bolt, Medusa and other Inhumans in order to assist a super-human strikeforce in taking down the confused Sentry.

Lockjaw assists his family tracking down Black Bolt, who had been captured by the Skrulls. Using technology gained from their allies, the Kree, Lockjaw's abilities are upgraded, allowing him to teleport much farther.

New allies
In 2009, Lockjaw received a four-issue mini-series titled Lockjaw and the Pet Avengers, teaming with Lockheed, Redwing, Ms. Lion (Aunt May's puppy from Spider-Man and His Amazing Friends), Zabu, Niels the Cat/Hairball, and a new frog named Throg. This series involves Lockjaw bringing the Infinity Gauntlet together with the assistance of animal allies. The series spawned two additional mini-series with the Pet Avengers.

Lockjaw re-joins his Inhuman family for the conflicts that eventually led to them taking over the Kree empire. This leads to the seeming loss of Black Bolt despite Crystal and Lockjaw's best efforts. This conflict also leads to the ravaging of the Shi'ar Empire. As his family determines who will rule, Lockheed is seen playing closely with Luna and assisting with Shi'ar recovery efforts. Lockjaw again becomes involved with gathering the Infinity Gauntlet together when the Soul Gem is lost and later found. Lockjaw was also sent by Medusa to keep an eye on recent Inhuman Ms. Marvel (Kamala Khan), and helps her in her battle against a cockatiel/human hybrid clone of Thomas Edison known as The Inventor.

During the Inhumans vs. X-Men storyline, Lockjaw was taking a nap when he is knocked out by Fantomex.

At the time when Lockjaw was on a mission to free Black Bolt from the deep space torture prison, a flashback revealed that Lockjaw got his powers during an Inhuman experiment on canines.

In the pages of "Death of the Inhumans", the Kree eventually initiated a murdering mission to bring Black Bolt to their ranks and across the stars as thousands of Inhumans were killed by Vox, the first of a new race of Super-Inhuman, built by the Kree. Black Bolt quickly sent Lockjaw to bring his brother to him, however Vox had already reached New Arctilan and was fighting Maximus when Lockjaw arrived, and while the canine was able to temporarily take down the Super-Inhuman, the latter released his full power that not only burned down New Arctilan but in the process also apparently killed Lockjaw and Maximus.

Powers and abilities
Lockjaw can teleport himself and nearby living creatures and matter to any destination on the Earth or the Moon. He can also open passages between dimensions. Energy barriers that are seemingly impenetrable to others seem to pose no problem to him. Lockjaw also has the ability to psionically trace a given "scent" across dimensional space. Lockjaw also once seemingly sensed danger from far off, when Doctor Doom had manipulated Silver Surfer's powers. Lockjaw is capable of chewing and swallowing inorganic material, such as scraps of sophisticated robots, with no ill effect. It is not known if this is his primary source of nourishment. Lockjaw seemingly has "super-canine" strength in his jaw. Once he locked on to the Thing's arm and the Thing could not get him to let go.

In the Secret Invasion: Inhumans mini-series, the Royal Family enter into an alliance with the Kree to free Black Bolt from his Skrull captors. To that end, the Kree greatly enhance Lockjaw's teleportation powers, enabling him to teleport himself and others over vast interplanetary distances.

Cultural impact and legacy

Critical reception 
Liz Wyatt of CBR.com referred to Lockjaw as one of Marvel's "fan favorite animal companions," stating, "Lockjaw is perhaps the cutest Inhuman out there...though we might be biased on that count. Lockjaw is not only extremely adorable, loyal, and okay...he's massive as well, but he's also very useful. You see, Lockjaw can teleport almost as well as he can drool. Which is saying something! Lockjaw is a massive bulldog, and an Inhuman to boot. He's made friends and allies with more than one Marvel character, and we're not surprised by that fact. This is one dog who has plenty of room for love in his heart. And that is why we love him so much." Chase Magnett of Comicbook.com called Lockjaw "one of the longest-lasting and most beloved super pets in existence," writing, "The bottom line with Lockjaw is that he's a very good dog. One of the best. If there were a We Rate Dogs Twitter in the Marvel universe, it would almost certainly give Lockjaw a 15/10. As a character, he reminds us of everything we love about our canine companions with an extra dose of superheroic powers and adventure on top. Lockjaw is loyal and loving, filled with fun, and there whenever his people need him. Whether you have a dog in your home or prefer to admire them from afar, the appeal of the species is obvious when looking at this big, jowled face. He's just such a good dog." CA Staff of ComicsAlliance asserted, "It's hard to imagine anyone not loving Lockjaw. He's a huge puppy dog who teleports you to where you need to go! He's so smart that for a while the story was that he wasn't a dog at all — but thankfully that was retconned, because Lockjaw is the best dog, and not letting him be one kind of ruins him. He's loyal to the Inhuman Royal Family — he even has a tuning fork on his head to match his master — but he's also spent time with the Thing and Ms. Marvel, two of Marvel's best characters. who are made even better with Lockjaw around. He may not star in many stories of his own, but if you could magically wish one comics character to life and hang out with them, Lockjaw would be an excellent choice." Simon Winter of WhatCulture said, "Despite being a dog, Lockjaw is by far the best member of the Inhumans. As 'Companion to the Royal Family of the Inhumans', Lockjaw plays an important part in keeping New Attilan safe from the countless threats it faces. However, if you think he's just a giant slobbering eating machine... Well, you'd be mostly right, but there's way more to this lovable mutt than meets the eye. In one of Marvel's greatest decisions, Lockjaw got his own Avengers team in 2009's Lockjaw and the Pet Avengers."

Accolades 

 In 2009, TIME included Lockjaw in their "Top 10 Oddest Marvel Characters" list.
 In 2014, Comicbook.com ranked Lockjaw 7th in their "10 Greatest Animals in Comics" list.
 In 2015, IGN included Lockjaw in their "7 Inhumans We Want on Agents of S.H.I.E.L.D." list.
 In 2016, ComicsAlliance ranked Lockjaw 1st in their "Marvel’s Royal Inhumans, Ranked From Worst To Best" list.
 In 2017, Comicbook.com included Lockjaw in their "8 Best Dogs in Superhero Comics" list.
 In 2019, CBR.com ranked Lockjaw 2nd in their "15 Coolest Pets In Comic Books" list and 5th in their "Marvel: 10 Fan Favorite Animal Companions" list.
 In 2019, Gizmodo ranked Lockjaw 12th in their "30 Very Good Sci-Fi Dogs" list.
 In 2020, CBR.com ranked Lockjaw 9th in their "10 Most Iconic Pets In Marvel Comics" list.
 In 2020, WhatCulture included Lockjaw in their "10 Marvel Pets You Wish You Could Adopt" list.
 In 2022, Screen Rant included Lockjaw in their "Super-Pets: The 10 Best From DC & Marvel" list and in their "10 Best Animal Characters Who Should Join The MCU" list.
 In 2022, Sportskeeda ranked Lockjaw 3rd in their "Top 5 comic book pets" list.
 In 2022, Syfy ranked Lockjaw 6th in their "Marvel and DC's super pets, ranked" list.
 In 2022, Collider included Lockjaw in their "10 Most Iconic Super-Pets in Comics" list.
 In 2022, The A.V. Club included Lockjaw in their "21 top superhero pets" list.
 In 2022, CBR.com ranked Lockjaw 2nd in their "15 Coolest Pets In Comic Books" list.

Literary reception

Volumes

Lockjaw and the Pet Avengers - 2009 
Marvel Comics announced that Lockjaw and the Pet Avengers #1 sold out in March 2009.

Doug Zawisza of CBR.com called Lockjaw and the Pet Avengers #1 an "all ages tour de force," stating, "Branded with an "All Ages" tag, this book is one for all ages—older fans of the Walter Simonson era of "Thor", fans of "Spider-Man and His Amazing Friends", X-Men fans, or just Marvel comics enthusiasts. This book serves as a reminder that not every comic needs to be hard-coded into continuity, so put that slide rule down and grab a copy of this book, as it brings an enthusiastic story to readers of the Marvel Universe. [...] This is a title that has come out of nowhere and deserves some recognition as it takes less than Z-list characters and offers an enjoyable tale that can be shared with long-term fans and younger readers alike. Eliopoulos gives of these characters each a voice and a reason to join up, but among them Lockheed really touched me in a way I hadn't thought of much before now." Daniel Crown of IGN gave Lockjaw and the Pet Avengers #1 a grade of 6.5 out of 10, asserting, "Ultimately, it's somewhat refreshing to see a child-friendly title like this one firmly set in the Marvel mythos proper. Lord knows the comic industry, and specifically the superhero genre, needs more all-ages comics. And to that end, Lockjaw and the Pet Avengers is just cute enough to skate by for adult readers, and should be more than acceptable for any little tyke who makes it a habit to ride their father or mother's leg into the comic store every Wednesday."

Lockjaw and the Pet Avengers Unleashed - 2010 
According to Diamond Comics Distributors, Lockjaw and the Pet Avengers Unleashed #1 was the 195th best selling comic book in March 2010.

Doug Zawisza of CBR.com said, "The Pets are fabulously rendered by Ig Guara, the artistic beast master from the previous series. Guara, thankfully, has returned for another go at the Pets, bringing expression and emotion to these critters while never failing to deliver fantastic backgrounds, foregrounds, and cursory characters. This issue only has two panels with human beings in it, but with Guara drawing Eliopoulos' story, there is certainly no shortage of characterization. Sotomayor and Roberts color the living daylights out of this book, making the frogs look like amphibians, and setting off Ms. Lion's fur, giving each animal an almost tangible difference in their appearance. Sabino's lettering is equally well-suited to this story, giving many of the animals a different tone and tenor. The rumble of the hippos is different from the resonance of Hairball's speech. The mystery of Frog Thor coupled with the last page reveal are a bit more than one would expect from an "All Ages" book, but it just proves that this is truly "All Ages" and not "intended for younger readers, but hoping older readers think it's cute enough to pay for." Well done, I say.  A single page Hulk-Pet Avengers story ends this issue with the characters teaming up with Blue Hulk to go to Ice Cream Mountain. It's silly and fun, and nice little extra for the younger readers written by Audrey Loeb and drawn by Dario Brizuela." Kevin Lee of Screen Rant included the Lockjaw and the Pet Avengers Unleashed comic book series in their "10 best super-pets comics storylines" list, saying, "A thought-provoking follow-up to Lockjaw and the Pet Avengers (2009), Unleashed #1-4 (2010) sees the Pet Avengers assemble when their mystical connection to Throg is lost. Eventually, they track Throg down, discovering the warped Golden One is destroying the mythical realm and plotting an incursion into the Earth realm. The dynamic creator duo of Super Pets, Eliopoulos and Guara, come together in this imaginative tale of finding oneself, friends, and the power of love when fueled by imagination."

Lockjaw - 2018 
According to Diamond Comics Distributors, Lockjaw #1 was the 139th best selling comic book in February 2018. Lockjaw #2 was the 190th best selling comic book in March 2018.

Brandon Davis of Comicbook.com gave Lockjaw #1 a grade of 4 out of 5, stating, "A tale of man's best friend kicks off as Lockjaw branches from the reins of Black Bolt and his Attilan home for a planet-trotting adventure. Daniel Kibblesmith pairs the oversized teleporting pup with once-hero D-Man for an adventure which will certainly teach them to rely on each other, possibly one more than the other, in an unnecessary but potentially quite fun adventure." Jesse Schedeen of IGN gave Lockjaw #1 a grade of 8.6 out of 10, saying, " By now readers should have a certain idea of what to expect from a comic about Lockjaw. He's a gigantic, teleporting dog with a habit of getting into wacky adventures when he isn't busy teleporting the Inhumans to and fro. Tonally, we're not exactly talking The Dark Knight Returns here. But while this new miniseries is every bit as goofy as one would expect, it also manages to weave in a surprising amount of emotional depth in the process. [...] It's understandable if readers are feeling burnt out on the Inhumans at this point. However, Lockjaw #1 offers an entertaining diversion from the norm that places more emphasis on Lockjaw's new partner than the trusty canine himself. This issue delivers all the wacky superhero fun one would expect, but it anchors that fun with a surprisingly deep look at a fallen hero in crisis."

Other versions

Age of Apocalypse
In the reality where Apocalypse had conquered North America, Apocalypse approached the Inhumans to gain access to the Terrigen Mist; however the Inhumans refused to deliver such material, until one of them, Maximus, made a secret deal with Apocalypse. Maximus would give the Terrigen Mist to Apocalypse if the High Lord granted him a position in the Horsemen. Maximus then took over the Inhumans Royal Family, slaying all those who stood in his way, including Lockjaw. As the new Death, Maximus created twisted clones based on the royal family that were loyal to him. The clone of Lockjaw clashed with the X-Men when they traveled to the Blue Area of the Moon to try to kill Apocalypse during a time when he was recuperating there. Lockjaw used its tuning fork to knock out Morph. The X-Men freed themselves and defeated Maximus. Despite the Inhumans' initial victory, Lockjaw and all of the Royal Family were killed when the Ship was destroyed by Sunfire.

Earth X
In the alternate future of Earth X, Lockjaw is shot by some gaseous bullet and murdered by Maximus. His teleportation-forehead assembly is seemingly the only part of him that has survived. It is used by Black Bolt and the other Inhumans to investigate happenings on Earth.

Marvel Knights 2099
Lockjaw is one of the few Royal family members to survive to the year 2099; Maximus the Mad had slain the rest. The Inhumans had established themselves on a space station also called Attilan.

Marvel Zombies
Lockjaw appears zombified along with the Royal Family of the Inhumans, creating a portal for them to meet with the Kingpin. He is later seen trying to attack Machine Man. The heroic android tricks Lockjaw into teleporting to the mainstream Marvel Universe. Lockjaw is tricked into eating an explosive-laden human brain. He is destroyed in the explosion. Another Lockjaw is seen when the zombie virus spreads to "Earth Z". He too is zombiefied and assists in slaying the "Warbound". He was captured by Machine Man, Ultron and Jocasta.

Ultimate Marvel
Lockjaw also appears in Ultimate Fantastic Four Annual #1. In this incarnation, he has teleportation powers as well. He leaves the Inhumans' Himalayan refuge with Crystal, who is running away because she was being forced to marry Black Bolt's brother, Maximus (only Crystal suspects he is mad). Lockjaw assists in saving Crystal from her pursuing guards but they eventually drag her back home anyway. They leave him behind and he brings the Fantastic Four for assistance. This is not well received as most of Inhuman society severely dislikes any outsiders. Black Bolt ends up destroying the evacuated Attilan simply because the Four "contaminated" it. Several of the Inhumans indicate they had conspired for Lockjaw to be left behind in the human world.

In other media

Television
 Lockjaw appears in The New Fantastic Four. In the episode "Blastaar, the Living Bomb Burst", he teams up with Blastaar.
 Lockjaw appears in the 1994 Fantastic Four series. In the episode "Hopelessly Impossible", he helps the Human Torch get the Impossible Man to the Great Refuge and away from the Super-Skrull.
 Lockjaw appears in the Hulk and the Agents of S.M.A.S.H.. He appears in the episode "Inhuman Nature." In the episode "Planet Monster" Pt. 2, Lockjaw (alongside Black Bolt and Gorgon) are among the superheroes that help the Agents of S.M.A.S.H. and the Avengers fight the forces of the Supreme Intelligence.
 Lockjaw appears in the Ultimate Spider-Man. In the episode "Inhumanity", he is among the Inhumans that are mind-controlled by Maximus the Mad. In "Agent Web", he was with the Inhuman Royal Family when they confronted Spider-Man and Triton outside the abandoned Inhuman city of Atarog and was the one who gave Spider-Man and Triton a ride back to the Triskelion.
 Lockjaw appears in the Guardians of the Galaxy. In "Crystal Blue Persuasion", he brings the Guardians of the Galaxy to Attilan at the time when the Inhumans have come down with a plague that causes crystals to grow on their bodies. Lockjaw was present when Maximus uses mind-control technology on Black Bolt. When Ronan the Accuser steals Maximus' mind-control helmet as part of his plan to destroy Attilan, Lockjaw is ordered by a mind-controlled Black Bolt to take him and Star-Lord to the Terrigen Crystal caverns beneath Attilan. Upon Star-Lord using the CryptoCube, Lockjaw was among the Inhumans cured of the plague. After Medusa thanks the Guardians of the Galaxy on Black Bolt's behalf, Star-Lord has Lockjaw fetch his baseball. In the episode "Inhuman Touch", Lockjaw helps the Guardians of the Galaxy when Maximus tricks his way out of prison. Throughout the episode, Lockjaw tries to tangle with Groot only for Groot to throw a stick he grows so that Lockjaw can fetch it.
 Lockjaw appears in the Avengers Assemble. In the episode "Inhumans Among Us", he is shown with Black Bolt, Medusa, Gorgon, and Karnak at the time when an Inhuman ship carrying Seeker and the Alpha Primitives crashes into the mountains near Maple Falls. Lockjaw had to take Hulk to the Inhuman laboratories on Attilan in order to obtain a Terrigen Crystal for a device to dispose of the Terrigen Fog. Upon arrival, Lockjaw sprained his paw causing Hulk to carry him while evading the Inhuman soldiers who mistook Hulk for trying to harm Lockjaw. Once they find the Terrigen Crystal, they teleport back to Maple Falls just in time to use the device following Inferno hatching from his Terrigen cocoon. In "The Inhuman Condition", Lockjaw brings the Avengers to Attilan in order to help Black Bolt fight Ultron who has invaded and captured the other Inhumans. During the fight, Lockjaw tried to rip off Ultron's leg to no avail.

 Lockjaw appears in the 2017 live-action Marvel Cinematic Universe (MCU) television series Inhumans. He is once again Crystal's pet and faithful companion, though it is implied that he isn't really smart. After helping the Royal Family escape Attilan when Maximus starts a coup d'état, Lockjaw is stunned by Pulssus and imprisoned in the Quiet Room while Crystal is placed under house arrest. Thanks to a trick to get away from Maximus, Crystal revives him with her powers and they escape to Hawaii, but Lockjaw is immediately injured by a passing motorist named Dave. He is revived to full health by Dave's ex-girlfriend Audrey. Afterwards, he teleports Crystal, Black Bolt, and Medusa back to Karnak upon reuniting with them. Lockjaw then returns his family back to Attilan to stop Maximus and finally returns them back to Earth when Attilan begins to fall. He is last seen with the evacuated Inhumans as Medusa makes a speech about the Inhumans finding a new home on Earth.
 Lockjaw appears in Marvel Future Avengers, voiced by Aaron LaPlante in the English dub.

Film
 Lockjaw appears in Marvel Rising: Secret Warriors, voiced by Dee Bradley Baker. In this version, he is a supporting animal/pet of Kamala Khan (aka Ms. Marvel) and member of the Secret Warriors.

Video games
 Lockjaw appears as a non-playable hero in Marvel: Ultimate Alliance. His duty was to send the heroes to the Shi'ar galaxy and Skrull homeworld to gather implements necessary to defeating a divinely-empowered Doctor Doom. Also though not there in appearance, the game implies that the mini-portals used in the game for midpoint to home-base transport are made by Lockjaw since every time the player tries to create a portal outside the circumstances when that is possible, the message "Lockjaw cannot create a portal in that area" appears. This creates somewhat of a continuity error since when the player gains that ability, it is attributed to an experimental teleportation device created by S.H.I.E.L.D. He also has special "conversations" with Spider-Man, Deadpool, and Thing.
 Lockjaw appears as a non-playable character in Marvel: Contest of Champions that only appears on the Gifting Badge and in Have You Seen This Dog? dialogue.
 Lockjaw appears as a playable character in Lego Marvel Super Heroes 2.
 Lockjaw is a playable character in Marvel Puzzle Quest. He was added to the game in September 2017.
 A statue of Lockjaw appears in the 2018 Spider-Man video game. The developers originally wanted to include Wall Street's Charging Bull, but replaced it with Lockjaw to avoid legal issues.

Non-fiction
 The debate over Lockjaw's sentience is discussed in Peter David's non-fiction book Writing For Comics. In this, he discussed how he tried to go with Stan Lee and Jack Kirby's original assertion that Lockjaw was a 'dumb animal'. He appears in a discussion of Marvel comics in a reprinted segment of a Casey At The Bat parody in The Penguin Book of Comics. In the context, he has accompanied Crystal to the baseball game.

Collected editions

References

External links
 
 Marvel Directory profile
 The Inhumans at Don Markstein's Toonopedia. Archived from the original on September 17, 2016.

Characters created by Jack Kirby
Characters created by Stan Lee
Comics characters introduced in 1965
Dog superheroes
Fictional characters with precognition
Fictional dogs
Inhumans
Marvel Comics animals
Marvel Comics characters who can teleport
Marvel Comics characters with superhuman strength
Marvel Comics superheroes
Marvel Comics television characters